"Turbulence" is a song by Laidback Luke and Steve Aoki, featuring vocals from American rapper and music producer Lil Jon. It was released on 14 May 2011 as a digital download in the United Kingdom and was released on 17 July 2011 as an EP. The radio edit version of the song was included on the bonus track version of Steve Aoki's debut album Wonderland. The song is also the current official goal song for the Toronto Maple Leafs.

Music video
A music video to accompany the release of "Turbulence" was first released onto YouTube on 8 March 2011 at a total length of three minutes and fifty-seven seconds.
The video shows Aoki, Luke, & Jon at a concert, with Aoki and Luke dressed as pilots, as storm clouds appear and lightning bolts strike down.

Track listing

Chart performance

Release history

References

2011 singles
Steve Aoki songs
Lil Jon songs
Songs written by Steve Aoki
Laidback Luke songs
Crunk songs